AK Mujibur Rahman is a Awami League politician and the former Member of Parliament of Bogra-8.

Career
Ahmed was elected to parliament from Bogra-8 as an Awami League candidate in 1973.

References

Awami League politicians
1910 deaths
2009 deaths
1st Jatiya Sangsad members
Bangladesh Krishak Sramik Awami League central committee members